Sepsina angolensis, the Angola skink, is a species of lizard which is found in Namibia, Angola, Zambia, and Democratic Republic of the Congo.

References

angolensis
Reptiles described in 1866
Taxa named by José Vicente Barbosa du Bocage